Sedum rubens is a species of annual herb in the family Crassulaceae. They are succulent plants. They have a self-supporting growth form and simple, broad leaves. Individuals can grow to 5.4 cm.

Sources

References 

rubens
Flora of Malta